The Meerbusch Challenger (known as Tennis Open Stadtwerke Meerbusch for sponsorship reasons) is a professional tennis tournament played on outdoor red clay courts. It is currently part of the Association of Tennis Professionals (ATP) Challenger Tour. It is held annually at Sportpark Büderich – am Eisenbrand in Meerbusch, Germany since 2013.

Past finals

Singles

Doubles

External links
ITF Search

ATP Challenger Tour
Clay court tennis tournaments
Maserati Challenger
Tennis tournaments in Germany